OMF may refer to:

 Object Module Format, an object-file format of the  VME operating system or of the IBM personal computer
 Open Media Framework, a file format that aids in exchange of digital media across applications and platforms
 Relocatable Object Module Format, an object-file format used primarily on Intel 80x86 microprocessors or Apple IIGS
 Offshoring Management Framework
 Ohmefentanyl, a potent piperidine narcotic
 One Must Fall, a fighting computer-game
 Open Source Metadata Framework, a Document Type Definition based on Dublin Core used for describing document metadata
 Opposing Military Force
 Oracle-managed files, a feature controlling datafiles in Oracle databases
 Ostmecklenburgische Flugzeugbau, a former (1998–2003) manufacturer of light aircraft
 OMF International, formerly Overseas Missionary Fellowship, a Christian missionary-society
 Organisation de la microfrancophonie, a micronational oorganisation
 Omnipresent Music Festival, an American music festival based in New York City.
 Options Market France a regulated stock index futures and options market with integrated clearing
 Gerry Wright Operations and Maintenance Facility, a light rail transit maintenance facility in Edmonton, Alberta, Canada